Mordellistena curtelineata is a beetle in the genus Mordellistena of the family Mordellidae. It was described in 1927 by Píc.

References

curtelineata
Beetles described in 1927